Robin Andrew (born 19 May 1945) is a former Australian rules footballer who played with Melbourne in the Victorian Football League (VFL).

Notes

External links 		

		
		
		
		
1945 births
Living people
Australian rules footballers from Victoria (Australia)		
Melbourne Football Club players